David Adams and Jeff Tarango were the defending champions, but played in this year with different partners.

Adams teamed up with Diego Nargiso and lost in first round to Cristian Brandi and Aleksandar Kitinov.

Tarango teamed up with Michael Hill and successfully defended his title, by defeating Paul Goldstein and Jim Thomas 6–3, 7–5 in the final.

Seeds
A champion seed is indicated in bold text while text in italics indicates the round in which that seed was eliminated.

Draw

Draw

References
 Main Draw (ATP)
 Qualifying Draw (ATP)

Doubles
2000 ATP Tour